Carol Ann Corrigan (born August 16, 1948) is an associate justice of the California Supreme Court.

Background 
Corrigan, the daughter of a newspaperman and a homemaker, grew up in the San Joaquin Valley city of Stockton, California.  She graduated from Saint Mary's High School in Stockton, and attended the Catholic, then women-only, Holy Names College in Oakland, graduating in 1970. After a brief stint in a graduate program in psychology, Corrigan enrolled at the University of California, Hastings College of the Law, where she served as Notes and Comments Editor of the Hastings Law Journal. She received her Juris Doctor degree in 1975 and was admitted to the California bar the same year.

Corrigan worked as a prosecutor in Alameda County, California from 1975, and as a senior prosecutor from 1985 until 1987 when she was appointed to the county's Municipal Court. In 1991 she became a Judge of the Alameda County Superior Court, the state's principal trial court there, where she was affectionately known as Big Bird. In 1994, Governor Pete Wilson appointed her as an associate justice in the California Court of Appeal, First District. She was elected to a term later in 1994, and re-elected in 1998. There, she served on a commission that overhauled the state's court rules.

Corrigan has resided in and around Oakland for most of her adult life.

California Supreme Court 

On December 9, 2005,  California Governor Arnold Schwarzenegger nominated her to the Supreme Court of California to replace Justice Janice Rogers Brown. Corrigan was confirmed in this position January 4, 2006.

Corrigan's notable opinions include a March 2, 2017, ruling in City of San Jose v. Superior Court, that emails and text messages on personal devices of government employees are subject to disclosure under the California Public Records Act. In 2012, she dissented in a case concerning the statute of limitations for claims of abuse by a priest. In 2011, she authored the majority opinion in Save the Plastic Bag Coalition v. City of Manhattan Beach, in which the court upheld a city ordinance banning plastic bags, reversing the appellate court. In 2008, she wrote a dissent in the same-sex marriage case, In re Marriage Cases.

In 2022, Corrigan upheld a lower-court order that forced UC Berkeley to cut its enrollment numbers after a group of Berkeley residents sued the university. The Berkeley residents claimed that UC Berkeley was violating the California Environmental Quality Act by expanding its enrollment numbers.

See also

 List of justices of the Supreme Court of California

References

Video

External links
 Carol A. Corrigan. California State Courts.
 Carol A. Corrigan. California Court of Appeal, First District.
 Past & Present Justices. California State Courts.

1948 births
Living people
20th-century American judges
20th-century American women judges
21st-century American judges
21st-century American women judges
American women lawyers
District attorneys in California
Holy Names University alumni
Judges of the California Courts of Appeal
Justices of the Supreme Court of California
People from Stockton, California
Superior court judges in the United States
University of California, Hastings College of the Law alumni
Women in California politics